Heisenberg model can refer to two models in statistical mechanics:

 Heisenberg model (classical), a classical nearest neighbour spin model
 Heisenberg model (quantum), a model where the spins are treated quantum mechanically using Pauli matrices